Miyan Dasht Rural District is a rural district (dehestan) in the Central District of Jajrom County, North Khorasan Province, Iran. At the 2006 census, its population was 6,010, in 1,421 families.  The rural district has 8 villages.

References 

Rural Districts of North Khorasan Province
Jajrom County